Clark County is a rural county in the U.S. state of Idaho; its county seat and largest city is Dubois. As of the 2020 Census, the county had a population of 790, making it the least populous county in the state.

History
Establishment of stage coach stops along the route between Salt Lake City and the Montana mining towns were established at Beaver Canyon ( named after Beaver Creek (Camas Creek) ) and Dry Creek (now Dubois) in 1864.  Originally part of Alturas County, both locations were transferred to Oneida County in 1877.  They became part of Bingham County at its creation in 1885.  Clark County was also the site of the Battle of Camas Creek during the Nez Perce War which occurred at Camas Meadows near Kilgore on August 20, 1872.  The Utah and Northern Railway reached Beaver Canyon in 1879.  By the 1890 Census, Beaver Canyon had a population of 216.  The settlement relocated to Spencer in 1897.

The majority of Clark County was transferred to Fremont County when it was created in 1893 with the remaining territory being transferred in 1896.  By the 1900 Census, 1,199 residents lived in the five precincts of Birch Creek, Dubois, Kilgore, Medicine Lodge, and Spencer.  At the 1910 census, the precincts contained 1,095 residents.

Dry Creek was renamed Dubois in 1892 and incorporated prior to 1920 while Spencer was incorporated in 1947.

The county was established  in 1919, partitioned from Fremont County by the state legislature; the county division bill was signed by Governor D. W. Davis on February 1. It was named for state senator Sam K. Clark, an early pioneer on Medicine Lodge Creek in the upper Snake River valley.

Geography

The northern border of the county is the Bitterroot Range of the Rocky Mountains, which forms the state line with Montana and is also the continental divide. Monida Pass also marks an east–west divide between Bitterroot subranges: the Beaverhead Mountains are to the west and the Centennial Mountains are to the east.

Adjacent counties
 Lemhi County – west
 Butte County – southwest
 Jefferson County – south
 Fremont County – east
 Beaverhead County, Montana – north

Major highways
 Interstate 15 – Monida Pass
 SH-22

National protected areas
 Caribou-Targhee National Forest (part)
 Nez Perce National Historical Park (part)
 Salmon-Challis National Forest (part)

Demographics

2000 census
As of the census of 2000, there were 1,022 people, 340 households, and 257 families living in the county.  The population density was 1 person per square mile (0/km2).  There were 521 housing units at an average density of 0 per square mile (0/km2).  The racial makeup of the county was 74.17% White, 0.10% Black or African American, 0.98% Native American, 0.20% Asian, 0.10% Pacific Islander, 23.48% from other races, and 0.98% from two or more races.  34.25% of the population were Hispanic or Latino of any race. 14.3% were of English, 8.1% German and 5.8% Irish ancestry.

There were 340 households, out of which 45.00% had children under the age of 18 living with them, 61.80% were married couples living together, 7.10% had a female householder with no husband present, and 24.40% were non-families. 20.00% of all households were made up of individuals, and 8.50% had someone living alone who was 65 years of age or older.  The average household size was 3.01 and the average family size was 3.52.

In the county, the population was spread out, with 35.20% under the age of 18, 8.00% from 18 to 24, 27.50% from 25 to 44, 20.10% from 45 to 64, and 9.20% who were 65 years of age or older.  The median age was 31 years. For every 100 females there were 110.70 males.  For every 100 females age 18 and over, there were 112.20 males.

The median income for a household in the county was $31,576, and the median income for a family was $31,534. Males had a median income of $23,854 versus $20,192 for females. The per capita income for the county was $11,141.  About 18.70% of families and 19.90% of the population were below the poverty line, including 24.10% of those under age 18 and 11.70% of those age 65 or over.

2010 census
As of the 2010 United States Census, there were 982 people, 345 households, and 243 families living in the county. The racial makeup of the county was 72.4% white, 1.0% American Indian, 0.7% black or African American, 0.5% Asian, 23.8% from other races, and 1.5% from two or more races. Those of Hispanic or Latino origin made up 40.5% of the population. In terms of ancestry, 14.8% were English, 7.4% were German, and 6.5% were American.

Of the 345 households, 37.7% had children under the age of 18 living with them, 57.4% were married couples living together, 7.0% had a female householder with no husband present, 29.6% were non-families, and 24.3% of all households were made up of individuals. The average household size was 2.84 and the average family size was 3.41. The median age was 32.7 years.

The median income for a household in the county was $40,909 and the median income for a family was $37,656. Males had a median income of $32,895 versus $24,125 for females. The per capita income for the county was $19,737. About 8.7% of families and 11.3% of the population were below the poverty line, including 21.5% of those under age 18 and 5.9% of those age 65 or over.

Education
The public schools in the county are operated by Clark County School District #161, headquartered in Dubois. Clark County High School competes in athletics in the Rocky Mountain Conference in IHSAA 1A Division II; the school colors are orange and black and its mascot is a bobcat.

Communities

Incorporated communities
Dubois (county seat)
Spencer

Unincorporated communities
Humphrey
Kilgore

Politics

Presidential elections
Clark County has participated in every presidential election since the election of 1920. The county has voted for every Republican candidate except in 1932 when it voted for the Democratic candidate Franklin D. Roosevelt giving him 54 percent of the vote. It was the solitary county in Idaho, and one of only three counties west of the Continental Divide alongside Rio Blanco County in Colorado and Kane County in Utah, to give at least a plurality to Alf Landon in his 1936 landslide defeat.

Voter registration

Government

Federal
The county is represented in the United States House of Representatives  by Republican Mike Simpson of the 2nd Congressional District. It is represented in the United States Senate by Republicans Mike Crapo and James Risch.

State
The county is in the 35th Legislative district. It is represented by Republican Senator Van Burtenshaw and Republican representatives Karey Hanks and Rod Furniss.

County
The county has 3 County Commissioners Nick Hillman, Greg Shenton, and Macoy Ward. The county also has other County officials like Sheriff, County Clerk, Attorney, Coroner, Treasurer, and Assessor.

See also
National Register of Historic Places listings in Clark County, Idaho

References

External links

State of Idaho official site – Clark County
Clark County School District #161
Clark county historical photographs at the Harold B. Lee Library, Brigham Young University

 
Idaho counties
1919 establishments in Idaho
Populated places established in 1919